Maisy is a British animated children's television series based on the book series of the same name by Lucy Cousins. The series aired for one season of 26 episodes, with each episode being made up of four segments. It won the British Academy Children's Award for Pre-School Animation in 2000.

Plot 
The show focuses on the lives of Maisy Mouse and her friends. A mellow-voiced narrator narrates the action and communicates with the characters while the animals go through their paces without speaking, they instead make unusual weird sounds and noises which sound like speaking since they're meant to be four to nine years old. The narrator, however, can understand them easily because he is the only one who actually speaks. The animated series keeps the two-dimensional visual style of the books.

Characters 
 Maisy is a six-year-old mouse who lives in an orange house with a red roof. She wears different clothes. She loves to paint and play with her friends.
 Tallulah is a four-year-old chick who is almost always seen wearing a dress and a bow.
 Cyril is a six-year-old squirrel who wears a green shirt.
 Charley is an eight-year-old crocodile who loves to eat.
 Eddie is a nine-year-old elephant who is often in settings where he is too big to participate as he is often depicted as being almost animalistic rather than anthropomorphic in appearance.

Production
Maisy was produced by King Rollo Films, PolyGram Visual Programming, and Universal Pictures Visual Programming.

Release and subsequent telecasts
Maisy first aired on CITV in the UK on 11 February 1999. The series finale aired on 2 November 2000, with repeats aired until the mid-2000s. In the United States, the series aired for several years on Qubo, following a 2008 licensing deal that the network reached with the show's distributor, NBCUniversal. Before Qubo, the show had been seen on the Nick Jr. block  on Nickelodeon, as well as Nickelodeon's sister network Noggin.

Accolades 
Maisy won the British Academy Children's Award for Pre-School Animation in 2000.

Home media and streaming
Maisy was released on VHS in the US from 1999 until 2001, at which point it was replaced with DVD releases. Universal Studios Home Entertainment released several Maisy videotapes in the US, most of them with the Macrovision copying protection system.

, the show was streaming on Peacock.

VHS releases (US) 
 Count with Maisy (3 August 1999)
 Maisy's Bedtime (3 August 1999)
 Maisy's Colors and Shapes (21 September 1999)
 Maisy's Friends (21 September 1999)
 Maisy's Birthday (15 February 2000)
 Play with Maisy (23 May 2000)
 Maisy Makes Music (12 September 2000)
 Maisy's Winter Fun (12 September 2000)
 Maisy's ABC (6 February 2001)
 Maisy's Springtime (28 February 2001)

VHS releases (UK) 
The series is also available on VHS and DVD in its native United Kingdom.
 Introducing Maisy (1999)
 Maisy Colours and Counting (2000)
 Maisy Animal Stories (2000)
 Maisy Birthday and other stories (2000)
 Maisy Christmas and other stories (2000)
 Maisy Bedtime and other stories (2000)
 Introducing Maisy (2001)
 Maisy's Fun in the Sun (2001)
 Maisy's Farm (2001)
 Maisy Playtime (2001)
 Maisy's ABC (2001) 
 Maisy Circus (2002)
 Maisy and Panda (2002)
 Maisy Activity Time/Splash (2002)
 Good Morning Maisy (2003)
 Maisy Fun and Games (2003)

DVD releases (US) 
 Good Morning Maisy (2004)
 Playtime Maisy (2004)
 Good Night Maisy (2004)

DVD releases (UK) 
 Maisy's Farm (2001)
 Maisy Christmas and other stories (2004)
 Maisy's ABC (2005)
 Maisy Colours and Counting (2000)
 Maisy Animal Stories (2000)
 Maisy Birthday and other stories (2000) (AUS)
 Maisy Bedtime and other stories (2000)
 Maisy Fun in the Sun (2006)
 Maisy Playtime (2006)
 Maisy Splash (2006)
 Maisy and Panda (2006)
 Maisy Discovers (2010)
 Maisy Animals (2010)
 Maisy Helps (2010)
 Maisy On the Go (2011)
 Maisy Garden (2010)
 Maisy Adventures (2010)
 Maisy Playtime (2010) (AUS)
 Maisy Birthday (2010) (AUS)
 Maisy Bedtime (2010) (AUS)
 Maisy Christmas (2010) (AUS)

List of Maisy episodes 
The show lasted for one season that consisted of 26 episodes. Each episode was made up of four segments, so there were 104 segments in total.

Song Shorts 
 Drip Drip Drop (The Rain Song)
 Here We Go Round the Mulberry Bush
 I Look Out of My Window
 I'm Gonna Write A Letter
 The Wheels on the Bus
 What Should We Do When We All Come In

References

External links 
 

1990s British animated television series
2000s British animated television series
1990s British children's television series
2000s British children's television series
1999 British television series debuts
2000 British television series endings
British children's animated adventure television series
British preschool education television series
Animated preschool education television series
1990s preschool education television series
2000s preschool education television series
English-language television shows
British television shows based on children's books
BAFTA winners (television series)
Television series by Universal Television
Animated television series about children
Animated television series about mice and rats
ITV children's television shows